The Atlanta Public Schools cheating scandal refers to the accusation that teachers and principals in the Atlanta Public Schools (APS) district cheated on state-administered standardized tests in 2009 and to the subsequent trial in 2014–2015.

Background
In 2009, The Atlanta Journal-Constitution published analyses of Criterion-Referenced Competency Tests (CRCT) results which showed statistically unlikely test scores, including extraordinary gains or losses in a single year. An investigation by the Georgia Bureau of Investigation (GBI) released in July 2011 indicated that 44 out of 56 schools cheated on the 2009 CRCT. One hundred and seventy-eight educators were implicated in correcting answers entered by students. Of these, 35 educators were indicted and all but 12 took plea deals; the remaining 12 went to trial. The size of the scandal has been described as one of the largest in United States education history.

The scandal thrust the debate over using high-stakes testing to hold educators accountable, mandated by the 2001 No Child Left Behind Act, into the national spotlight. Teachers who confessed to cheating blamed "inordinate pressure" to meet targets set by the district and said they faced severe consequences such as a negative evaluation or termination if they didn't.

Prior to the scandal, the APS had been lauded for making significant gains in standardized test scores. Between 2002 and 2009, eighth-graders' scores on the National Assessment of Educational Progress reading test jumped 14 points, the highest of any urban area. Superintendent Beverly Hall, who served from 1999 to 2010, was named Superintendent of the Year in 2009. The GBI's report said Hall "knew or should have known" about the scandal. Hall's lawyer has denied she had any knowledge of cheating practices. In 2013, she was indicted in relation to her role in the matter. On September 6, 2013, Tamara Cotman, an executive director, represented by Benjamin Davis, was found not guilty of influencing a witness.

Trial
The trial began on September 29, 2014, presided over by Fulton County Superior Court Judge Jerry Baxter. It was the longest criminal trial in Georgia history, lasting eight months. The lead prosecutor was Fani Willis. Before the end of the trial, the superintendent at the center of the scandal, Beverly Hall, died of breast cancer, aged 68.

On April 1, 2015, eleven of the twelve defendants were convicted on racketeering charges. Dessa Curb was the only teacher found not guilty on all charges.

Sentences
 Donald Bullock, former testing coordinator: Weekends in jail for 6 months, $5,000 fine, 5 years of probation and 1,500 hours of community service.
 Sharon Davis-Williams, Tamara Cotman, and Michael Pitts: 20 years in prison, to serve seven, $25,000 fine and 2,000 hours of community service.
 Sentences for Cotman, Pitts & Davis-Williams were reduced from 7 to 3 years and fines to $10,000.
Sharon Davis-Williams and Michael Pitts are former school reform team executive directors.
Dana Evans: 5 years in prison, one to serve, and 1,000 hours of community service.
 Angela Williamson and Tabeeka Jordan, former Deerwood Academy assistant principal: 5 years in prison, two to serve, $5,000 fine and 1,500 hours of community service.
 Diane Buckner-Webb, former Dunbar Elementary teacher: 5 years in prison, one to serve, $1,000 fine, 1,000 hours in community service and first offender treatment.
 Theresia Copeland, former Benteen Elementary testing coordinator: 5 years in prison, one to serve, $1,000 fine and 1,000 hours of community service.
 Pamela Cleveland, former Dunbar Elementary teacher: 5 years' probation, home confinement for a year from 7:00 p.m. to 7:00 a.m. and community service.
Shani Robinson, former first-grade Dunbar Elementary teacher: one year in prison, 4 years of probation, $1,000 fine, 1,000 hours of community service.

Nine of the 11 educators convicted of racketeering appealed. Two of those nine, Tamara Cotman Johnson and Angela Williamson, went directly to the appeals court, lost, and reported for prison in October 2018.

In popular culture
Jon Stewart, the then-host of The Daily Show, compared the cheating scandal to Wall Street scandal.

Art & adaptation

Wrong Answer 
Ryan Coogler will work with Michael B. Jordan for a fourth time in the upcoming film Wrong Answer, based on the Atlanta Public Schools cheating scandal.

Ranked 
The Atlanta Public Schools cheating scandal was an inspiration for Ranked, a musical about academic pressure in school. Kyle Holmes (book) and David Taylor Gomes (music & lyrics) cite the scandal as one of their main inspirations for a storyline that featured adults cheating on behalf of students. The show opened at Granite Bay High School three weeks after Operation Varsity Blues charges were made public. The timing of the musical's debut in relation to the scandal was serendipitous, and earned the high school national attention.

References

External links
"Cheating Our Children" on The Atlanta Journal-Constitution
Educators Cheating on Tests Not New; Doing Something About it Would be, Richard P. Phelps
The Atlanta Scandal: Teaching in “A Culture of Fear, Intimidation and Retaliation”, Erich Martel
Atlanta School Cheating Scandal: The Untold Story of Corporate Greed and Criminalization of Teachers on Democracy Now!

Public education in Georgia (U.S. state)
Scandals in the United States
Cheating in school
Education scandals